Merrill Pye (August 14, 1902 – November 17, 1975) was an American art director. He was nominated for an Academy Award in the category Best Art Direction for the film North by Northwest.

Selected filmography
 North by Northwest (1959)

References

External links

1902 births
1975 deaths
American art directors
Burials at Forest Lawn Memorial Park (Glendale)